This list of University of Manitoba alumni includes notable graduates, non-graduates, and current students of the University of Manitoba.

List

{| class="wikitable"
!Name
!Occupation / Known for
!UM credentials/activities
!Additional details
|-
|Douglas Abra
|judge
|BA (1968); LL.B (1972)
|
|-
|Samuel Hunter Adams
|lawyer and 21st Mayor of Calgary 
|BA (1906)
|
|-
|Tracie O. Afifi
|research scientist
|BSc (1999); MSc (2003), PhD (2009)
|
|-
|Judie Alimonti
|immunologist and research scientist
|PhD
|
|-
|Peter Allen
|composer 
|BMus (1975)
|
|-
|Rob Altemeyer
|politician
|BA 
|
|-
|Nancy Ames
|scientist
|BSc (1980); BSc (1982)
|
|-
|Victor Anonsen
|footballer and artist
|BA (1977)
|
|-
|Frank Aquila
|judge 
|LL.B (1982)
|
|-
|Germaine Arnaktauyok
|printmaker, painter and illustrator
|BFA (1968)
|
|-
|Niki Ashton
|politician
|BA
|
|-
|Gordon J. G. Asmundson
|psychologist and professor
|MA; PhD (1991)
|
|-
|David Asper
|lawyer and businessman; son of Izzy Asper
|BA (1981)
|
|-
|Gail Asper
|lawyer; daughter of Izzy Asper
|BA (1981); LL.B.(1984)
|
|-
|Izzy Asper
|tax lawyer and media magnate of CanWest Global Communications Corp.
|BA (1953); LLB (1957); LLM (1964)
|In 2000, the University's Faculty of Management was re-named to the Asper School of Business in his honour.
|-
|Robert Astley
|actuary 
|BSc
|
|-
|Ken Attafuah
|criminologist  
|BA (1982)
|
|-
|Nahlah Ayed
|reporter  
|BSc; MSc
|
|-
|George Ayittey
|economist and president of the Free Africa Foundation 
|PhD
|
|-
|Tim Ball
|public speaker and professor
|MA
|
|-
|G. Michael Bancroft
|chemist and synchrotron scientist; first director of the Canadian Light Source
|MSc (1964)
|
|-
|David G. Barber
|environmental scientist 
|BSc (1981); MSc (1987)
|
|-
|Kathy Bardswick
|President and CEO of The Co-operators
|BS
|
|-
|Lindon W. Barrett
|cultural theorist
|BA (1983)
|
|-
|Robert Beamish
|cardiologist
|MD (1942) 
|
|-
|William Moore Benidickson
|former Member of Parliament, federal Cabinet Minister, and Senator
|
|
|-
|Richard Spink Bowles
|lawyer and former Manitoba Lieutenant-Governor
|BA (1933); LLB (1937)
|
|-
|George Montegu Black II
|businessman, father of Conrad Black
|
|
|-
|Andy Blair
|National Hockey League player in the 1920s and 1930s, mostly with the Toronto Maple Leafs
|
|
|-
|Yvonne Brill
|rocket and jet propulsion engineer who invented the fuel-efficient rocket thruster that keeps satellites in orbit today.
|BS (1945)
|The Yvonne C. Brill Lectureship in Aerospace Engineering of the American Institute of Aeronautics and Astronautics (AIAA) is named in her honor and presented annually
|-
|Harold J Brodie
|mycologist
|BSc (1929)
|
|-
|Harold Buchwald
|lawyer
| BA (1948); LL.B (1952); LL.M (1957)
|
|-
|Wilfred Buck
|scientific facilitator and Indigenous star lore expert
|B.Ed. 
|
|-
|Constantine of Irinoupolis
|American Orthodox hierarch, Primate of the Ukrainian Orthodox Church of the USA
|St. Andrew's College graduate (1959)
|
|-
|Don Callis
|professional wrestler, MHSAA Darts finalist (1978)
|BA (1991); MBA (2003)
|
|-
|Norman Cantor
|medieval scholar and writer
|BA (1951)
|
|-
|Albert Chan
|Hong Kong politician and lawmaker
|BA; BSW
|
|-
|Richard Condie
|Academy Award-nominated animator; creator of The Big Snit
|BA (1967)
|
|-
|Brian Dickson
|former Chief Justice of Canada
|LL.B (1938)
|
|-
|Gerry Ducharme
|politician and a cabinet minister in the 1988–1995 Progressive Conservative government
|
|
|-
|Mary Dunn
|President of the Dominion Women's Amateur Hockey Association and the Manitoba branch of the Women's Amateur Athletic Federation of Canada
|BS (1938)
|
|-
|Audrey Dwyer
|actor and writer
|
|
|-
|Marcel Dzama
|artist
|BFA (1997)
|
|-
|Ed Evanko
|actor and singer
|BA
|
|-
|Gordon S. Fahrni
|Canada’s longest-lived physician (108 years old)
|MD (1911)
|
|-
|Faouzia
|singer-songwriter
|
|
|-
|Fernanda Ferreira
|cognitive psychologist
|BA in Psychology (1982)
|
|-
|Gary Filmon
|Premier of Manitoba (1988–1999)
|BSc Civil Engineering
|
|-
|Danny Finkleman
|former CBC Radio host
|LL.B
|
|-
|Bruce Flatt
|CEO of Brookfield Asset Management and billionaire ranked on Forbes magazine
|BComm
|
|-
|Steven Fletcher
|politician; former Conservative MP in the House of Commons; former federal Cabinet Minister
| BSc geological engineering; MBA at Asper
|
|-
|Nahanni Fontaine
| politician
|MA
|
|-
|Phil Fontaine
|Indigenous Canadian leader
|BA (1981)
|
|-
|Waldron Fox-Decent
|mediator, professor, Crown Corporation chairman
|BA (1959); MA (1971)
|
|-
|Eira Friesen
|advocate for women in Winnipeg
|BSc (1939)
|
|-
|Patrick Friesen
|poet, playwright, essayist
|
|-
|Erving Goffman
|sociologist who introduced the concept of dramaturgy into the field
|BSc
|
|-
|Velvl Greene
|scientist and academic
|BS in agriculture; MS dairy bacteriology
|
|-
|Monty Hall
|television personality
|BSc
|Hall was also president of Variety Clubs International and received the Order of Canada 
|-
|Ellie Harvie
|actress
|BA
|
|-
|S.I. Hayakawa
|scholar and professor of semantics; United States Senator
| BA (1927)
|
|-
|John Alexander Hopps
|inventor of the world's first artificial pacemaker; known as the "father of biomedical engineering in Canada"
|BEng (1941)
|
|-
|Gad Horowitz
|political scientist who coined the term "Red Tory"
|BA
|
|-
|Barbara Humphreys
|architect and author, specializing in public service, historic preservation, and housing
|B.Arch. (1941) 
|
|-
|Johanna Hurme
|architect and activist
|BEnvD (1996); MArch
|
|-
|Israel Idonije
|retired NFL defensive end
|
|
|-
|Jamaluddin Jarjis
|former Malaysian ambassador to the United States; former Malaysian government minister
|MSc
|
|-
|Francis Lawrence Jobin
|former Lieutenant-Governor of Manitoba
|
|
|-
|F. Ross Johnson
|businessman; CEO of RJR Nabisco
|BComm (1952)
|
|-
|Tanya Kappo
|lawyer and Indigenous rights activist
|JD (2012)
|
|-
|Sam Katz
|mayor of Winnipeg (2004–2014)
|BA (1973)
|
|-
|Guy Gavriel Kay
|novelist and poet
|BA (1975)
|
|-
|David Kilgour
|former federal Minister of Transport
|BA
|
|-
|Wab Kinew
|politician
|BA 
|
|-
|Greg Kopp
|Acting Dean of Engineering at the University of Western Ontario
|BSc (1989)
|
|-
|Scott Koskie
|former member of the Canada men's national volleyball team
|BRMCD (1995)
|
|-
|Amanda Lang
|journalist; senior business correspondent for CBC News
|
|
|-
|Allan Levine
|author, known mainly for his award-winning non-fiction and historical mystery writing
|BA (1978)
|
|-
|Bob Lowes
|ice hockey coach and executive
|
|
|-
|James Lunney
|politician; former Conservative Member of Parliament for the riding of Nanaimo—Alberni in BC
|
|
|-
|Inky Mark
|former federal Conservative Member of Parliament for Dauphin—Swan River, Manitoba
|
|
|-
|Bill Mason
|author, filmmaker, environmentalist
|
|
|-
|Pearl McGonigal
|former Lieutenant-Governor of Manitoba
|
|
|-
|William John McKeag
|former Lieutenant-Governor of Manitoba
|
|
|-
|Marshall McLuhan
|famed media scholar
|
|
|-
|Harry Medovy
|pediatrician and academic
|
|
|-
|Olawale Sulaiman
|neurosurgeon and academic
|
|
|-
|Ovide Mercredi
|Aboriginal Canadian leader
|LLB (1977)
|
|-
|Ted Milian,
|Canadian football player
|
|
|-
|W.O. Mitchell
|writer
|
|
|-
|W. L. Morton
|historian
|
|
|-
|Arnold Naimark
|physician, academic, and former President of the U of M
|
|
|-
|Alison Norlen
|artist
|
|
|-
|William Norrie
|mayor of Winnipeg (1979–1992)
|BA (1950); LLB (1955)
|
|-
|Rey Pagtakhan
|physician, academic, former MP and federal cabinet minister
|
|
|-
|Malcolm Peat
|Emeritus Professor at Queen's University
|
|Member of the Order of the British Empire (MBE)
|-
|Jim Peebles
|astrophysicist
|
|won the Crafoord Prize (2005), Nobel Prize in Physics (2019), Companion of the Order of Canada, Order of Merit (CC, OM, 2020)
|-
|Leonard Peikoff
|philosopher
|
|
|-
|Frank Pickersgill
|Special Operations Executive agent in World War II executed by the Nazis
|
|
|-
|Barry Posner
|physician and research scientist on diabetes
|
|
|-
|Jon Pylypchuk
|artist
|
|
|-
|Clay Riddell
|oil tycoon; founder, president and CEO of Paramount Resources, based in Calgary
|BSc Honours (1959)
|the University's Clayton H. Riddell Faculty of Environment, Earth, and Resources is named in his honour
|-
|Dufferin Roblin
|former Premier of Manitoba
|
|
|-
|Claude C. Robinson
|ice hockey and sports executive
|1902
|Inductee into the Hockey Hall of Fame and Canadian Olympic Hall of Fame
|-
|Marshall Rothstein
|Supreme Court of Canada judge
|
|
|-
|Alexei Maxim Russell
|internationally-published novelist
|
|
|-
|Fred Sandhu
|Provincial Court of Manitoba judge
|
|
|-
|Edward Schreyer
|Premier of Manitoba (1969–1977) and Governor General of Canada (1979–1984)
|
|
|-
|Cynthia Scott
|Oscar winning filmmaker
|BA
|
|-
|Richard Scott
|former Chief Justice of Manitoba Court of Appeal
|
|
|-
|Harry Seidler
|Australian architect
|
|
|-
|Mitchell Sharp
|former Liberal Minister of Finance
|
|
|-
|Patricia Alice Shaw
|linguist specializing in phonology and known for her work on First Nations languages
|
|
|-
|Louis Slotin
|physicist and chemist who took part in the Manhattan Project
|BSc (1932); MSc (1933)
|
|-
|Robert Steen
|Mayor of Winnipeg (1977–1979)
|
|
|-
|Mary Ann Steggles
|Commonwealth scholar and international expert on British colonial statuary
|
|Olive Beatrice Stanton recipient
|-
|Iain Stewart
|theoretical physicist
|
|
|-
|Frank Trafford Taylor
|lawyer and former president of Kiwanis International
|
|
|-
|John W.M. Thompson
|Manitoba MLA and Provincial Cabinet Minister
|
|
|-
|Grace Eiko Thomson
|curator, activist, and internment camp survivor
|BFA (1977)
|
|-
|Thorbergur Thorvaldson
|cement chemist
|
|
|-
|Miriam Toews
|novelist
|
|
|-
|Vic Toews
|politician; former Minister of Justice and Attorney General and the President of the Treasury Board in the cabinet of Prime Minister Stephen Harper
|
|
|-
|Andrew Unger
|satirist and novelist
|BA (2002); BEd. (2004)
|
|
|-
|Chris Urmson
|CEO of Aurora Innovation
|BSc (1998)
|
|
|-
|Meaghan DeWarrenne-Waller
|fashion model; winner of Canada's Next Top Model, Cycle 3
|
|
|-
|Adele Wiseman
|author
|
|
|-
|Svetlana Zylin
|playwright and director
|
|
|}

 Gordon Orlikow (b. 1960), decathlon, heptathlon, and hurdles competitor, Athletics Canada Chairman, Canadian Olympic Committee member, Korn/Ferry International partner; competed for the Manitoba Bisons in track and field, and is honored on the Bisons Walkway of Honour.

References

 
Manitoba
Lists of people from Manitoba